Konstantin Päts' third provisional cabinet was in office in Estonia from 27 November 1918 to 9 May 1919, when it was succeeded by Otto Strandman's first cabinet.

Members

References

Cabinets of Estonia
Provisional governments